The Sri Lanka national cricket team toured Pakistan from December 1991 to January 1992 and played a three-match Test series against the Pakistan national cricket team. Pakistan won the Test series 1–0. Sri Lanka were captained by Aravinda de Silva and Pakistan by Imran Khan. In addition, the teams played a five-match Limited Overs International (LOI) series which Pakistan won 4–1.

Squads

Test series summary

1st Test

2nd Test

3rd Test

One Day Internationals (ODIs)

Pakistan won the series 4-1.

1st ODI

2nd ODI

3rd ODI

4th ODI

5th ODI

Records and statistics

Batting

Bowling

References

External links

1991 in Sri Lankan cricket
1991 in Pakistani cricket
1992 in Sri Lankan cricket
1992 in Pakistani cricket
1991-92
International cricket competitions from 1991–92 to 1994
Pakistani cricket seasons from 1970–71 to 1999–2000